The Rans S-10 Sakota is an American single-engined, tractor configuration, two-seats in side-by-side configuration, mid-wing monoplane designed by Randy Schlitter for aerobatics and manufactured by Rans Inc. The Sakota is available in kit form for amateur construction.

Production of the S-10 was ended as part of Rans' extensive reorganization of its product line on 1 June 2006, after having been available for 18 years, but the S-10 was reintroduced in about 2009 and is again available.

Design and development
The S-9 Chaos was designed by Randy Schlitter in 1986 as an inexpensive single-seat aerobatic aircraft for sportsman competition aerobatics and advanced aerobatics if inverted fuel and oil systems are installed. The S-10 Sakota was designed two years later, in 1988, as a two-seat version of the S-9 that can conduct aerobatics when flown solo or fly cross country with two occupants.

Like many Rans models, the S-10 features a welded 4130 steel tube cockpit, with a bolted aluminum tube rear fuselage. All fuselage, wing and tail surfaces are covered in dope and fabric. The reported construction time is 600 man-hours.

The Sakota has conventional landing gear.

Operational history
There were 215 S-10s built and flown by December 2011.

In November 2010 there were 42 S-10s registered in the United States, along with six registered in Canada and 12 in the UK.  Another 58 were on the registers of European countries west of Russia.

Specifications (S-10)

See also

References

External links

Photo of an S-10 Sakota
Photo of an S-10 Sakota

1980s United States civil utility aircraft
Homebuilt aircraft
S-010 Sakota
Aerobatic aircraft
Mid-wing aircraft
Single-engined tractor aircraft
Aircraft first flown in 1988